María Ruiz Román, also known as Mery, is a Spanish football forward. She currently plays for CD Tacón.

She has also played in Spain and the United States. With FC Indiana she won the 2007 WPSL. Additionally she was named the Final Four MVP.

References

External links

Profile at Txapeldunak

1983 births
Living people
Women's association football forwards
Spanish women's footballers
Footballers from Madrid
Primera División (women) players
Sporting de Huelva players
RCD Espanyol Femenino players
USL W-League (1995–2015) players
F.C. Indiana players
Zvezda 2005 Perm players
FC Zorky Krasnogorsk (women) players
Kubanochka Krasnodar players
Real Madrid Femenino players
Spanish expatriate footballers
Spanish expatriate sportspeople in the United States
Expatriate women's soccer players in the United States
Spanish expatriate sportspeople in Russia
Expatriate women's footballers in Russia